Local Yokel Media, (LYM), is, a hyperlocal online ad marketplace headquartered in Stamford, Connecticut specializing in monetizing hyperlocal, ad impressions. Using Local Yokel Media, any local or national business serving a defined geography can target audiences in their immediate service areas on local online content communities.

Local Yokel Media uses this method of geo-contextual relevance to help firms target down to the community level in contextually relevant content. Founder & CEO Dick O'Hare is a veteran of the digital media industry with 15 years in senior management positions at DoubleClick, AOL Media Networks and Yahoo Inc.

References 

Online advertising services and affiliate networks